The Women's double FITA round division 3 was an archery competition at the 1984 Summer Paralympics.

The British archer Helen Hilderley won the gold medal.

Results

References

1984 Summer Paralympics events